Blowing Rock may refer to:
 The town of Blowing Rock, North Carolina
 The rocky outcropping Blowing Rock (land feature), near the town of the same name
 Blowing Rock, Virginia, an unincorporated community
 Caribbean island belonging to Anguilla